Delahaie is a surname. Notable people with the surname include:

Agnès Delahaie (1920–2003), French film producer
Felix Delahaie (1767–1829), French gardener
Georges Delahaie (1933–2014), French sculptor

See also
Delahaye (surname)